Lianxi may refer to:

 Lianxi District
Lianxi, Dao County